WRRN (92.3 FM) is a radio station broadcasting a classic hits format. Licensed to Warren, Pennsylvania, United States, the station is currently owned by Lilly Broadcasting and features programming from ABC News Radio and Westwood One's "Greatest Hits" format.

History
WRRN signed on the air April 22, 1948, as WNAE-FM on 92.1 MHz. The station was started by the Northern Allegheny Broadcasting Company, under the ownership of president and general manager David Potter. It was the sister station of WNAE, an AM station that had signed on after World War II had ended, and the Federal Communications Commission (FCC) began to issue licenses to radio stations.  The licensing process had been halted once the U.S. had entered the war. W. LeRoy Schneck was program director and would one day assume control of both stations.

WNAE-FM first signed on the air with an effective radiated power of 3,000 watts. In 1951, it changed its call letters to WRRN and moved to 92.3. By the 1970s, the station would increase its power to 26,000 watts and then to 50,000 by the 1980s.  The station would periodically simulcast with WNAE at varying times, as WNAE was a daytime-only station until the late 1980s.

In 1974, WNAE and WRRN were sold by Northern Allegheny Broadcasting to Kinzua Broadcasting Company, a company formed by longtime program director W. LeRoy Schneck, who now served as company president and station General Manager.  Dave Whipple assumed Schneck's programming duties.

For many years, WRRN was a beautiful music radio station branded as "Easy 92.3".  Like many other such formatted radio stations, WRRN played 10-inch reel-to-reel music tapes from a dedicated automation playback system, with the occasional news brief from AP Network News and local news from WNAE's newsroom.

While operating as an easy listening station, WRRN simulcast WNAE's morning show from 6 to 9 am Monday through Friday.  Though music formats at times varied for WNAE over the years, music played during the simulcast was more soft rock-oriented to better buffer the easy listening format once the simulcast had ended for the day.

In 2002, the station changed its format to oldies, then transitioned to classic hits in August 2014.

On September 30, 2005, Kibco Radio sold WRRN and its two sister stations to Radio Partners, LLC, which owned WBVP and WMBA in Beaver Falls and Ambridge, Pennsylvania, respectively.  Radio Partners LLC President Frank Iorio retained W. LeRoy Schneck as general manager for a period to assist with the transfer of ownership.

In 2019, after a failed attempt to sell the stations to Laurel Media two years prior, Radio Partners, LLC sold WRRN, along with its sister stations WKNB and WNAE, to Lilly Broadcasting, which operates WICU-TV and WSEE-TV in Erie, Pennsylvania, for $900,000.

References

External links
92 Gold Facebook

RRN
Warren County, Pennsylvania
1948 establishments in Pennsylvania
Radio stations established in 1948